Hushi may refer to:

Place 
 Huşi, city in Vaslui County, Romania
 Hu Shih (胡適; 1891–1962), Chinese philosopher and diplomat
 Hohhot (呼市), capital of Inner Mongolia, China
 Hushi, Putian (笏石镇), town in Xiuyu District, Putian, Fujian, China
 Hushi Town, Tianmen (胡市镇), Hubei, China

Name 

 Hushidar "Hushi" Mortezaie (born 1972), Iranian-American fashion designer